The quarter, short for quarter dollar, is a United States coin worth 25 cents, one-quarter of a dollar. The coin sports the profile of George Washington on its obverse, and after 1998 its reverse design has changed frequently. It has been produced on and off since 1796 and consistently since 1831.

It has a diameter of 0.955 inch (24.26 mm) and a thickness of 0.069 inch (1.75 mm). Its current version is composed of two layers of cupronickel (75% copper, 25% nickel) clad on a core of pure copper.
 With the cupronickel layers comprising 1/3 of total weight, the coin's overall composition is therefore 8.33% nickel, 91.67% copper. Its weight is 0.1823 troy oz. or 0.2000 avoirdupois oz. (5.670 grams).

Designs before 1932

"Two bits" (that is, two eighths of a piece of eight) is a common nickname for a quarter.

From 1796 the quarter was minted with 0.2377 oz. (6.739 g) of 89.24% fine silver (.2121 oz. [6.014 g] fine silver), revised to 90% fine silver from 1838 to 1964. It weighed 0.2357 oz. (6.682 g) from 1838, 0.2194 oz. (6.22 g) from 1853, and 0.2204 oz. (6.25 g) from 1873 to 1964. Six designs, five regular and one commemorative, have been issued until 1930:
Draped Bust 1796–1807
Draped Bust, Small Eagle 1796
Draped Bust, Heraldic Eagle 1804–1807
Capped Bust 1815–1838
Capped Bust (Large Size), With Motto 1815–1828
Capped Bust (Small Size), No Motto 1831–1838
Seated Liberty 1838–1891
Seated Liberty, No Motto 1838–1865
Seated Liberty, With Motto 1866–1891
Barber 1892–1916
Isabella quarter commemorative 1893
Standing Liberty 1916–1930
Standing Liberty (Type 1) 1916–1917 (featured an image of Liberty with one of her breasts exposed)
Standing Liberty (Type 2 or Type 2a) 1917–1924
Standing Liberty (Type 3 or Type 2b) 1925–1930

Washington quarter 

The original version of the Washington quarter issued from 1932 to 1998 was designed by sculptor John Flanagan. The obverse depicted George Washington facing left, with "Liberty" above the head, the date below, and "In God We Trust" in the left field. The reverse depicted an eagle with wings outspread perches on a bundle of arrows framed below by two olive branches.

It was minted in 0.2204 oz. (6.25 g) of 90% fine silver until 1964, when rising silver prices forced the change into the present-day cupronickel-clad-copper composition, which was also called the "Johnson Sandwich" after then-president Lyndon B. Johnson.

As of 2011, it cost 11.14 cents to produce each coin.

Regular issue Washington quarters:
Silver quarter, 1932–1964
Clad composition quarter, 1965–1998
50 State quarters, 1999–2008
District of Columbia and United States Territories quarters, 2009
America the Beautiful quarters, 2010–2021
Washington Crossing the Delaware, 2021
American Women quarters, 2022–2025
Semiquincentennial quarters, 2026
Youth Sports quarters, 2027–2030

Commemorative and bullion issue Washington quarters:
United States Bicentennial coinage quarter in clad & 40% silver, 1975–1976 (all were dated 1776–1976)
Silver proof set quarter, 1992–1998
America the Beautiful silver bullion coins in 5-ounce silver, 2010–2021

US states and territories quarters, 1999–2009 

In 1999, the 50 State quarters program of circulating commemorative quarters began. These have a modified Washington obverse and a different reverse for each state, ending the former Washington quarter's production completely. On January 23, 2007, the House of Representatives passed  extending the state quarter program one year to 2009, to include the District of Columbia and the five inhabited US territories: Puerto Rico, Guam, American Samoa, the United States Virgin Islands, and the Commonwealth of the Northern Mariana Islands. The typeface used in the state quarter series varies a bit from one state to another, but is generally derived from Albertus.

America the Beautiful quarters, 2010–2021 

On June 4, 2008, the America's Beautiful National Parks Quarter Dollar Coin Act of 2008, was introduced to the House of Representatives. The America the Beautiful quarters program began in 2010 and ended in 2021, lasting 12 years and depicting a natural or historic site for each state and territory.

2021: Return of the original obverse, new legislation 

Following the conclusion of the America the Beautiful quarter series in 2021, Treasury Secretary Steven Mnuchin had the option of ordering a second round of 56 quarters, but did not do so by the end of 2018 as required in the 2008 legislation.

The quarter's design for 2021 therefore reverted to Flanagan's original obverse design, paired with a new reverse rendition of Washington crossing the Delaware River on the night of December 25, 1776. In October 2019, the Citizens Coinage Advisory Committee (CCAC) met to consider designs, with the final choice made by Mnuchin. On December 25, 2020, the Mint announced the successful design, by Benjamin Sowards as sculpted by Michael Gaudioso. This quarter was released into circulation on April 5, 2021, and was minted until the end of 2021.

The Circulating Collectible Coin Redesign Act of 2020 established three new series of quarters for the next decade. From 2022 to 2025, the Mint may produce up to five coins each year featuring prominent American women, with a new obverse design of Washington. In 2026, there will be up to five designs representing the United States Semiquincentennial. From 2027 to 2030, the Mint may produce up to five coins each year featuring youth sports. The obverse will also be redesigned in 2027, and even after 2030 is still to depict Washington.

American Women Quarters 

The American Women Quarters Program will issue up to five new reverse designs each year from 2022 to 2025 featuring the accomplishments and contributions made in various fields by women to American history and development. The obverse features Laura Gardin Fraser's portrait of George Washington originally intended for the first Washington quarter in 1932.

Collecting silver Washington quarters
The "silver series" of Washington quarters spans from 1932 to 1964; during many years in the series it will appear that certain mints did not mint Washington quarters for that year. No known examples of quarters were made in 1933, San Francisco abstained in 1934 and 1949, and stopped after 1955, until it resumed in 1968 by way of making proofs. Denver did not make quarters in 1938. Proof examples from 1936 to 1942 and 1950 to 1967 were struck at the Philadelphia Mint; in 1968, proof production was shifted to the San Francisco Mint. The current rarities for the Washington quarter "silver series" are:

Branch mintmarks are D = Denver, S = San Francisco. Coins without mintmarks were all made at the main Mint in Philadelphia. This listing is for business strikes, not proofs:

1932-D
1932-S
1934 – with Doubled Die Obverse (DDO)
1935-D
1936-D
1937 – with Doubled Die Obverse (DDO)
1937-S
1938-S
1939-S
1940-D
1942-D – with Doubled Die Obverse (DDO)
1943 – with Doubled Die Obverse (DDO)
1943-S – with Doubled Die Obverse (DDO)
1950-D/S Over mintmark (coin is a 1950-D, with underlying S mintmark)
1950-S/D Over mintmark (coin is a 1950-S, with underlying D mintmark)

The 1940-D, 1936-D and the 1935-D coins, as well as many others in the series, are considerably more valuable than other quarters. This is not due to their mintages, but rather because they are harder to find in high grades (a situation referred to as "condition rarity"). Many of these coins are worth only melt value in low grades. Other coins in the above list are expensive because of their extremely low mintages, such as the 1932 Denver and San Francisco issues. The overstruck mintmark issues are also scarce and expensive, especially in the higher grades; even so they may not have the same popularity as overdates found in pre-Washington quarter series.

The 1934 Philadelphia strike appears in two versions: one with a light motto [for "In God We Trust"], which is the same as that used on the 1932 strikings, and the other a heavy motto seen after the dies were reworked. Except in the highest grades, the difference in value between the two is minor.

The mint mark on the coin is located on the reverse beneath the wreath on which the eagle is perched, and will either carry the mint mark "D" for the Denver Mint, "S" for the San Francisco Mint, or be blank if minted at the Philadelphia Mint.

Collecting clad Washington quarters

The copper-nickel clad Washington quarter was first issued in 1965 and as part of the switch, the Denver mintmark was added in 1968, which did not reappear on any US coin denomination until 1968. For the first three years of clad production, in lieu of proof sets, specimen sets were specially sold as "Special Mint Sets" minted at the San Francisco mint in 1965, 1966, and 1967 (Deep Cameo versions of these coins are highly valued because of their rarity).

Currently, there are few examples in the clad series that are valued as highly as the silver series but there are certain extraordinary dates or variations. The deep cameo versions of proofs from 1965 to 1971 and 1981 Type 2 are highly valued because of their scarcity, high grade examples of quarters from certain years of the 1980s (such as 1981–1987) because of scarcity in high grades due to high circulation and in 1982 and 1983 no mint sets were produced making it harder to find mint state examples, and any coin from 1981 to 1994 graded in MS67 is worth upwards of $1000.

The mint mark on the coin is currently located on the obverse at the bottom right hemisphere under the supposed date. In 1965–1967 cupro-nickel coins bore no mint mark; quarters minted in 1968–1979 were stamped with a "D" for the Denver mint, an "S" for the San Francisco mint (proof coins only), or blank for Philadelphia. Starting in 1980, the Philadelphia mint was allowed to add its mint mark to all coins except the one-cent piece. Twenty-five-cent pieces minted from 1980 onwards are stamped with "P" for the Philadelphia mint, "D" for the Denver mint, or "S" for San Francisco mint.

Until 2012 the "S" mint mark was used only on proof coins, but beginning with the El Yunque (Puerto Rico) design in the America the Beautiful quarters program, the US Mint began selling (at a premium) uncirculated 40-coin rolls and 100-coin bags of quarters with the San Francisco mint mark. These coins were not included in the 2012 or later uncirculated sets or the three-coin ATB quarter sets (which consisted of an uncirculated "P" and "D" and proof "S" specimen) and no "S" mint-marked quarters are being released into circulation, so that mintages will be determined solely by direct demand for the "S" mint-marked coins.

In 2019, the West Point Mint released two million of each of the five designs that year with a "W" mint mark for general circulation, in a move intended to spur coin collecting. This was continued in 2020, which turned out to be the final year of the "W" mint marked quarters as no quarters with the mint mark have been produced since.

See also

 50 State quarters (1999–2008)
 America the Beautiful quarters (2010–2021)
 America the Beautiful silver bullion coins, 5 troy ounce silver bullion coins based on America the Beautiful quarters
 DC and US Territories quarters (2009)
 Quarter (Canadian coin)
 United States Mint coin production
 United States Bicentennial coinage (1975–1976)
 United States quarter mintage figures
 Washington quarter

References

External links

 Official specifications 
 http://www.usmint.gov/faqs/circulating_coins/index.cfm?action=faq_circulating_coin 
 https://web.archive.org/web/20040813033020/http://acoin.com/regularissue/regular25c.htm
 US Quarters by year and type. Histories, photos, and more.

Twenty-five-cent coins of the United States
1796 introductions
George Washington on United States currency